Matthew Paul Leonard Bulbeck (born 8 November 1979) is a former English First-class and List A cricketer who made appearances for Somerset during his senior career. He also made appearances at Youth Test and Youth One Day International level for England. He was primarily a bowler, but scored two First-class half centuries batting in the lower order. He won the NBC Denis Compton Award in both 1998 and 1999, but was forced to retire early from first-class cricket because of a back injury. He went on to work at the Somerset County Ground as an administrator.

References

1979 births
Living people
English cricketers
Somerset cricketers
Sportspeople from Taunton
Somerset Cricket Board cricketers